Common End may refer to the following places in England:

Common End, Colkirk, Norfolk
Common End, Cumbria
Common End, Derbyshire